The 2014 Copa Claro was a men's tennis tournament played on outdoor clay courts. It was the 17th edition of the Copa Claro, and part of the ATP World Tour 250 series of the 2014 ATP World Tour. It took place in Buenos Aires, Argentina, from February 8 through February 16, 2014.

Singles main-draw entrants

Seeds 

 Rankings are as of February 3, 2014.

Other entrants 

The following players received wildcards into the singles main draw:
  Facundo Argüello
  David Ferrer
  Guido Pella

The following players received entry from the qualifying draw:
  Martín Alund
  Christian Garín
  Máximo González
  Rubén Ramírez Hidalgo

Withdrawals
Before the tournament
  Rafael Nadal (stomach virus)

Retirements
  Robin Haase (back injury)

Doubles main-draw entrants

Seeds 

 Rankings are as of February 3, 2014.

Other entrants 
The following pairs received wildcards into the doubles main draw:
  Facundo Bagnis /  Federico Delbonis
  Máximo González /  Eduardo Schwank

Finals

Singles 

  David Ferrer defeated  Fabio Fognini, 6–4, 6–3

Doubles 

  Marcel Granollers /  Marc López defeated  Pablo Cuevas /  Horacio Zeballos, 7–5, 6–4

References

External links 

 Official website

Copa Claro
ATP Buenos Aires
Copa
Copa Claro